Geoffrey Katsigazi Tumusiime, is a Ugandan military officer and diplomat, who serves as the Deputy Inspector General of Police of Uganda, since January 2022. He is a Major General in the UPDF and immediately prior to his current assignment, he served as the Deputy Commander of the UPDF Air Force. Previously,he served as the Defence Liaison Officer at the headquarters of the East African Community, in Arusha, Tanzania.

Military career
Major General Geoffrey Katsigazi Tumusiime served in the past as Commander of the UPDF Motorized Infantry Brigade and as the Acting Chief of Staff of the UPDF Land Forces, among other appointments.

In January 2020, he took over as deputy commander of the UPDF Air Force, replacing Major General Gavas Mugyenyi, who was appointed Uganda's military attache to India. On 28 March 2020, he was promoted from the rank of Brigadier to that of Major General.

See also
Charles Lutaaya

References

External links
 Partial List of Senior UPDF Commanders
 Who is who? List of UPDF top brass and what they do As of 27 November 2014.

Year of birth missing (living people)
Living people
Ankole people
People from Mbarara District
Ugandan military personnel
People from Western Region, Uganda
Ugandan generals